Petar Šegedin (8 July 1909 – 1 September 1998) was a Croatian writer.

Šegedin was born in Žrnovo, on the island of Korčula. He graduated from the Faculty of Humanities and Social Sciences, University of Zagreb. He worked as a professor and diplomat, and later as a professional writer. In the 1970s he was blacklisted due to his criticism of the communist authorities, and lived for a while in a self-imposed exile in Germany.

From his debut novel Children of God (Djeca božja), published in 1946, Šegedin's work broke away from socialist realism and introduced existentialism into Croatian literature. He is also noted for his essays and travelogues.

Šegedin served as a president of Matica hrvatska and the Croatian Writers' Association. He was a full member of the Croatian Academy of Sciences and Arts since 1963. Šegedin is the 1991 laureate of the Vladimir Nazor Award for Life Achievement in Literature.

Sources
 Umro Petar Šegedin 
 Petar Šegedin (1909 - 1998) 
 Deceased members
 Ljetopis Petra Šegedina 
 Bibliografija 
 Šegedin, Petar 

1909 births
1998 deaths
Croatian novelists
Male novelists
Croatian essayists
Croatian male writers
Male essayists
Faculty of Humanities and Social Sciences, University of Zagreb alumni
Members of the Croatian Academy of Sciences and Arts
Vladimir Nazor Award winners
Existentialists
20th-century novelists
20th-century essayists
Croatian expatriates in Germany
20th-century male writers